WBCU (1460 AM) is a radio station broadcasting a country music format to the Union, South Carolina, United States, area.  The station is currently owned by Union-Carolina Broadcasting Company, Inc., and features programming from Westwood One News and Westwood One 24-hour formats, as well as South Carolina Radio Network and the syndicated Clark Howard Show.

According to the station's website, WBCU also provides local news, sports, weather and community events.  The station broadcasts the entire football, baseball and basketball schedule of Union County High School, the University of South Carolina and Clemson University football and basketball games and the Atlanta Braves baseball games.

The transmitter and antenna system are located west of Union on Rice Avenue. During daytime hours, a single tower is used for an omnidirectional signal pattern. At night, the antenna system uses three towers arranged in a directional array that concentrates the signal towards the east.

An FM translator came online in February 2008. Its official call sign is W278BE, broadcasting on 103.5 FM.

On October 31, 2014, WBCU began streaming its signal online. It also released Android and iPhone apps for mobile access to the stream.

References

External links

BCU